"I Bet You Think About Me" is a song by American singer-songwriter Taylor Swift featuring American singer-songwriter Chris Stapleton, from Swift's second re-recorded album, Red (Taylor's Version) (2021). Swift wrote the song with Lori McKenna and produced it with Aaron Dessner. The song is a country ballad accompanied by a harmonica, with tongue-in-cheek lyrics describing the "high tone" lifestyle of a former lover. Critics praised Swift's songwriting, Stapleton's vocal harmony, and the country production.

Upon the album's release, the single peaked at number 22 on the US Billboard Hot 100 and number three on the Hot Country Songs chart, and peaked at number 43 in Australia and number 17 in Canada. Republic Records and MCA Nashville released "I Bet You Think About Me" to the U.S. country radio on November 15, 2021, as a single from Red (Taylor's Version). 

An accompanying music video for the song premiered on YouTube on November 15 as well. Starring Swift and Miles Teller, the video was written by Swift and American actress Blake Lively, directed by Lively in her directorial debut, and co-produced by Austin Swift. The music video was later nominated for Video of the Year at the 57th Academy of Country Music Awards and 56th Annual Country Music Association Awards, marking Lively's first nomination for music industry awards. The song was also nominated for Best Country Song at the 65th Annual Grammy Awards (2023).

Background

American singer-songwriter Taylor Swift wrote "I Bet You Think About Me" at Gillette Stadium in Foxborough, Massachusetts, during her Speak Now World Tour (2011-12), for her next studio album. She then contacted American musician Lori McKenna, through their mutual friend Liz Rose, to ask McKenna to join the song as a co-writer. Swift released her fourth studio album, Red, on October 22, 2012, through Big Machine Records. "I Bet You Think About Me" was not part of the track-list. The album, however, was a critical success, ranking at number 99 on Rolling Stone 2020 revision of the 500 Greatest Albums of All Time. By June 2021, it had sold over four million pure copies in the United States.

In 2019, Swift signed with Republic Records after her contract with Big Machine expired in 2018; her contract with the label granted her rights to the master recordings of her music. Big Machine, as well as the master recordings of Swift's first six studio albums, were acquired by businessman Scooter Braun through his holding company Ithaca Holdings. Swift began re-recording her Big Machine albums in November 2020, as a mean to own her master recordings; at the same time, Ithaca sold rights to Taylor Swift's Big Machine recordings to Shamrock Holdings for $300 million. The first re-recorded album, Fearless (Taylor's Version), the re-recording of Swift's 2008 album, was released on April 9, 2021. She released her second re-recorded album, Red (Taylor's Version), the re-recording of Red, on November 12, 2021. In addition to the original Red tracks, Red (Taylor's Version) features nine unreleased "from the Vault" tracks that were meant for the 2012 album but did not make the cut; "I Bet You Think About Me" was revealed to be one of these tracks.

Lyrics and production

While Swift was on the Speak Now World Tour, in Foxborough, Massachusetts, she wrote "I Bet You Think About Me" at Lori McKenna's house in June 2011. Swift stated, "We wanted this song to be like a comedic, tongue-in-cheek, funny, not caring what anyone thinks about you sort of breakup song," and explained that she and McKenna wanted to write a drinking song. The 2021 version of "I Bet You Think About Me" was recorded throughout studios in Belfast and New York, and the orchestra by London Contemporary Orchestra was recorded at the EBC Studio in London. Chris Stapleton's vocals were recorded at Sputnik Sound Studio in Nashville. The track was produced by Swift and Aaron Dessner. It was mixed and engineered by Dessner and Jonathan Low, with assistance from Josh Kaufman, at Dessner's Long Pond Studios in New York.

"I Bet You Think About Me" is a country ballad that incorporates additional pop elements, typical of Swift's discography in the original Red album. Described as folk-pop by Taste of Country, the song is a harmonica-driven track with twangy vocals and background vocal harmonies from feature artist Chris Stapleton. In the lyrics, Swift makes multiple "cheeky jabs" towards her ex-lover and his lifestyle. The ex-lover in question has "made [Swift] feel inferior" towards him; she fails to fit in with his "upper-crust circles", and he has once told her that he and Swift are "too different." Recounting the differences between the two former partners' childhoods, she labels herself as a girl "raised on a farm" and the ex-lover as someone from a "silver spoon" and "gated community".  At the end of the song, Swift additionally calls out her ex-lover's "organic shoes" and "million-dollar couch."

Critical reception
"I Bet You Think About Me" received widespread praise in the press, with critics appreciating Stapleton's guest feature. Writing for Variety, Chris Willman gave "I Bet You Think About Me" a five-out-of-five rating. Although Willman considered Stapleton's guest appearance too short, he praised the track for its rowdier country production compared to what "Swift was pulling off at the time" and the sharp lyrics. Jessica Nicholson from Billboard complimented Stapleton's "burnished, bluesy vocal" which together with Swift's delivery brought forth a "well-crafted" song. In USA Today, Melissa Ruggieri wrote that although Stapleton's "whiskey-hued vocals are the beautiful sandpaper to Swift's sleek voice – the tune should be remembered for some of Swift's snarkiest lyrics."

Commercial performance
After Red (Taylor's Version) was released, "I Bet You Think About Me" debuted at number 22 on the US Billboard Hot 100 chart dated November 27, 2021. According to MusicRow, it was the most added song on country radio during its first week of release. The single peaked at number 23 on the Country Airplay chart and number three on the Hot Country Songs chart. In Canada, "I Bet You Think About Me" reached number 17 on the Canadian Hot 100 and number 34 on the Canada Country chart. The song peaked at number 22 on the Billboard Global 200, number 43 on the ARIA Singles Chart in Australia, and number 75 on the UK Streaming Chart in the United Kingdom.

Music video

A music video for "I Bet You Think About Me" premiered on video sharing platform YouTube on November 15, 2021. Swift and American actress Blake Lively wrote the treatment for the video, and the latter directed it in her directorial debut. Stapleton does not appear in the video.

The video documents a wedding, with the wedding couple played by actor Miles Teller and his wife Keleigh Sperry Teller. Swift plays an ex-girlfriend who intrudes upon the wedding. Co-producer Aaron Dessner has a cameo as a member of the wedding band, while Swift's brother, actor Austin Swift, is credited as a producer for the music video. The six-minute video begins with Teller, at his wedding party, having flashbacks to his and Swift's failed relationship. At the wedding ceremony, Swift knocks over the groom figurine on top of the cake, chugs wine after giving a toast, and goofs off with children guests. The video contains references to other Swift music videos and All Too Well: The Short Film, as well as multiple references to the Lewis Carroll stories of Alice's Adventures in Wonderland and Through the Looking-Glass. Swift had been asked about Easter eggs prior to the release, quoting Carroll in response.

Accolades 
In 2022, the "I Bet You Think About Me" music video was nominated for Video of the Year at 57th Academy of Country Music Awards, and at the 56th Annual Country Music Association Awards for Video of the Year as well. At the 65th Annual Grammy Awards (2023), the song received a nomination for Best Country Song.

Personnel
Credits adapted from Red (Taylor's Version) album liner notes

Production

 Taylor Swift – lead vocals, songwriter, producer
 Lori McKenna – songwriter
 Chris Stapleton – background vocals
 Aaron Dessner – producer, recording engineer
 Michael Fahey – assistant vocal recording
 Josh Kaufman – additional recording engineer
 Jonathan Low – recording engineer, mixer
 Jeremy Murphy – strings recording
 Vance Powell – vocal recording
 Christopher Rowe – vocal recording

Musicians

 Robert Ames – conductor
 Bryce Dessner – orchestrator
 London Contemporary Orchestra – orchestra
 Aaron Dessner – acoustic guitar, bass guitar, high-strung guitar, piano
 Josh Kaufman – electric guitar, harmonica, lap steel guitar
 Zara Benyounes – first violin
 Galya Bisengalieva – first violin
 Antonia Kesel – first violin
 Natalie Kouda – first violin
 Anna Ovsyanikova – first violin
 Charlotte Reid – first violin
 Dave Brown – double bass
 Anna de Bruin – second violin
 Guy Button – second violin
 Charis Jenson – second violin
 Nicole Crespo O'Donoghue – second violin
 Nicole Stokes – second violin
 Eloisa-Fleur Thom – second violin
 Stephanie Edmudson – viola
 Clifton Harrison – viola
 Matthew Kettle – viola
 Zoe Matthews – viola
 Jonny Byers – cello
 Oliver Coates – cello
 Max Ruisi – cello
 James Krivchenia – drums, percussion

Charts

Weekly charts

Year-end charts

Release history

Notes

References

2011 songs
2021 singles
2020s ballads
Taylor Swift songs
Chris Stapleton songs
Songs written by Taylor Swift
Songs written by Lori McKenna
Song recordings produced by Taylor Swift
Song recordings produced by Aaron Dessner
Country ballads
Folk ballads
Pop ballads
Male–female vocal duets
Republic Records singles